Milionia is a genus of moths in the family Geometridae erected by Francis Walker in 1854.

Species
 Milionia aetheria (Turner, 1947)
 Milionia aroensis Rothschild 
 Milionia basalis Walker, 1854
 Milionia brevipennis Jordan & Rothschild, 1895
 Milionia callima Rothschild & Jordan, 1905
 Milionia callimorpha Oberthür, 1894
 Milionia celebensis Jordan & Rothschild, 1895
 Milionia clarissima  (Walker 1865)
 Milionia cyanifera (Walker, [1865])
 Milionia diva Rothschild 
 Milionia drucei Butler, 1883
 Milionia dulitana Rothschild, 1897
 Milionia elegans (Jordan & Rothschild, 1895)
 Milionia exultans Rothschild, 1926
 Milionia fulgida Vollenhoven, 1863
 Milionia glaucans (Stoll, [1782])
 Milionia isodoxa Prout 
 Milionia lepida Jordan, 1915
 Milionia luculenta Swinhoe, 1889
 Milionia macrospila Jordan, 1903
 Milionia meeki Jordan & Rothschild, 1895
 Milionia paradisea Jordan, 1903
 Milionia pendleburyi Prout, 1932
 Milionia philippinensis Rothschild, 1895
 Milionia pulchrinervis Felder, 1874
 Milionia queenslandica Jordan & Rothschild, 1895
 Milionia rawakensis (Quoy & Gaimard, 1825)
 Milionia snelleni Butler, 1883
 Milionia zonea Druce, 1888

References

Boarmiini
Geometridae genera